The Tri-Tone Fascination is the second and final studio album by guitarist Shawn Lane, released in 1999 through Eye Reckon Records; a second edition was reissued in 2000, containing a revised track listing (with the omission of two songs) and different cover art. The opening track, "Kaiser Nancarrow", was inspired by and named after composer Conlon Nancarrow.

Track listing

Personnel
Shawn Lane – vocals, guitar, keyboard (except track 9), drums (except tracks 1, 3, 5), drum machine, bass (except tracks 3, 5, 9), production
Luther Dickinson – guitar (tracks 3, 5)
Buddy Davis – guitar (track 9)
Tom Ward – keyboard (track 9)
Sean Rickman – drums (track 1)
Cody Dickinson – drums (tracks 3, 5)
Paul Taylor – bass (tracks 3, 5)
Eric Phillips – bass (track 9)
Les Birchfield – executive production

References

Shawn Lane albums
1999 albums